Robin Handique (Assamese:ৰবীন সন্দিকৈ) was a founding member of the banned terrorist outfit ULFA in Assam. He was an arms and explosive expert who later became a chief advisor of the outfit along with Bhimkanta Buragohain. He was in charge of five camps in Myanmar and also its Central Assam Commander for several years.

Arrest
He was captured along with top ULFA leaders including Buragohain, Amulya Chandra Rai alias Amarjeet Gogoi and Bolin Das alias Kamal Kachari during the Operation All Clear by Royal Bhutanese Army in December 2003. He was later handed over to the Indian authorities in Assam.

Death and its aftermath
Handique died of kidney failure on August 31, 2005  in a Tezpur hospital while in jail custody. But the outfit alleged that Handique's death was due to slow poisoning by the authorities. Arabinda Rajkhowa, the chairman of the outfit said that Handique had various ailments but was denied proper medical facilities. The outfit also called a 12-hour Assam bandh on September 8.

The Assam Human Rights Commission (AHRC) directed the Sonitpur District Magistrate to get the matter inquired into by a senior magistrate.

See also
List of top leaders of ULFA
Sanjukta Mukti Fouj
28th Battalion (ULFA)

References

ULFA members
2005 deaths
Year of birth missing
Deaths from kidney failure
Indian people who died in prison custody
Prisoners and detainees from Assam